James Edward Stephens (born 25 August 1993) is an English football goalkeeper.

Career
Stephens started his career in the youth set up at Forest Green Rovers but moved to Swindon Town where his impressive showings brought him to the attention of Liverpool who signed him up for their academy in April 2010. He spent the 2012–13 season on loan at Airbus UK Broughton.

He was released by Liverpool in July 2013 and joined Newport County. He made his Football League debut for Newport in a League Two clash with Accrington Stanley on 3 August 2013. He made his League Cup debut in Newport's first round 3–1 win at Brighton & Hove Albion on 7 August 2013. In September 2014 Stephens was due to join Brackley Town on loan but issues with international clearance prevented the move to Brackley and he subsequently joined Gloucester City on loan in October 2014.

He was released by Newport in May 2015 at the end of his contract. On 6 August 2015, he signed for Barnet on a one-year deal. He won Barnet Player of the Year 2016–17, as well as the Fan's Player of the Year Award. He was released by Barnet at the end of the 2017–18 season.

His next appearance would be a Middlesex Senior Cup tie for Northwood in January 2020.

Career statistics

References

External links
Newport County profile

1993 births
Living people
People from Wotton-under-Edge
English footballers
Association football goalkeepers
Forest Green Rovers F.C. players
Swindon Town F.C. players
Liverpool F.C. players
Airbus UK Broughton F.C. players
Newport County A.F.C. players
Gloucester City A.F.C. players
Barnet F.C. players
Northwood F.C. players
English Football League players
National League (English football) players
Cymru Premier players
Isthmian League players
Sportspeople from Gloucestershire